Chan Mah Phee (born in Amoy, China) was a Hoklo Chinese businessman, land-owner, investor and philanthropist who founded numerous successful ventures in Rangoon (now Yangon), Burma in 1800s and 1900s.

Early life 
Chan was born in Amoy, Fujian, China in the nineteenth century to his father Chan Ee Shin. In 1870, Chan migrated to Singapore before ultimately moving to Rangoon in 1872.

Rangoon

Chan Mah Phee founded his most successful business Taik Leong Co. in Rangoon in 1883. The company dealt primarily in oil, rice and tobacco. Chan Mah Phee was also a director of The Chinese Steamship Co., Limited. Chan was the largest Chinese land owner and most important Chinese rice-dealer in Burma. In a Rangoon where communities remained voluntarily segregated down ethnic lines, he managed to be a prominent figure in Rangoon with many connections which extended far beyond the municipality's Chinese community.

Philanthropic work

Chan Mah Phee and Daw Aye Mya built a Tazaung at the Shwedagon Pagoda. They also offered Satu-ditha at the Tabaung Festival. They also donated to build Hwa Kyone High School (later known as No 3 Regional College / Kyimyindine Campus, Rangoon University). They built Chan Mah Phee hospital in Ahlon where a street was named in his honor.

Legacy
The Chan Ma Phee hall of Shwedagon Pagoda was named in his honor in recognition of his patronage and financial contributions to the temple. Chan Mah Phee's second son, Chan Chor Khine inherited and expanded his father's businesses. Chan Chor Khine was educated at St. Paul's High School, Rangoon.

References

Hokkien businesspeople
20th-century Burmese businesspeople
Burmese people of Chinese descent
People from Xiamen
Businesspeople from Xiamen